Gujranwala Electric Power Company (GEPCO) is an electric distribution company which supplies electricity to the Gujranwala region in Punjab, Pakistan. The jurisdiction of the company includes Sialkot, Narowal, Gujranwala, Gujrat, Hafizabad  and  Mandi Bahauddin districts. The current Chief Executive Officer of GEPCO is Engineer Muhammad Ayub.

See also

 List of electric supply companies in Pakistan

References

External links
 

Distribution companies of Pakistan
Gujranwala District
Government-owned companies of Pakistan
Energy in Punjab, Pakistan